Thesenvitz is a village and a former municipality in the Vorpommern-Rügen district, in Mecklenburg-Vorpommern, Germany. Since 1 January 2011, it is part of the town Bergen auf Rügen.

References

External links

Official website of Thesenvitz

Villages in Mecklenburg-Western Pomerania
Bergen auf Rügen
Towns and villages on Rügen